The differences between additives for fracking  in different countries are the type of chemicals used (hazardous, non-hazardous), the disclosure of chemicals and the composition of fracturing fluid. In 2010, Halliburton announced the creation of food additive based hydraulic fracturing fluid in response to calls for transparency and demand for a "more environmentally friendly" unconventional hydrocarbon production.

Europe

In Europe, Poland, Norway and Germany have the largest reserves of shale gas, and drillings are underway.

United Kingdom
In the United Kingdom, the environmental regulator permits only chemical additives which are classed as non hazardous to groundwater for fracturing fluids. Operators are required to disclose the content of hydraulic fracturing fluids to the relevant environment agency while the composition must be disclosed if the regulator demands it. The permitted additives for hydraulic fracturing fluid include polycrylamide, hydrochloric acid and a biocide.

United States
In the US, about 750 compounds have been listed as additives for hydraulic fracturing, also known as ingredients of pressurized fracking fluid, in an industry report to the US Congress in 2011 after originally being kept secret for "commercial reasons". The following is a partial list of the chemical constituents in additives that are used or have been used in fracturing operations, as based on the report of the  New York State Department of Environmental Conservation, some are known to be carcinogenic.

See also
 Hydraulic fracturing
 Hydraulic fracturing in the United Kingdom
 Hydraulic fracturing in the United States
 Hydraulic fracturing proppants
 Uses of radioactivity in oil and gas wells

References

Hydraulic fracturing
Water and the environment
Chemistry-related lists